Pavel Šporcl (born 25 April 1973) is a Czech violinist.

He was a notable pupil of Václav Snítil.   Studied also with Itzhak Perlman, Dorothy Delay or Eduard Schmieder. He combines a talent for classical music with a rather unorthodox presence, with a characteristic headscarf.

Šporcl is married to actress Barbora Kodetová. They have three daughters: Lily Marie (born 15 February 2001), Violetta (born 26 July 2007) and Sophia (born 24 August 2009).

References

External links
 Website

1973 births
Czech violinists
Male violinists
Musicians from České Budějovice
Academy of Performing Arts in Prague alumni
Recipients of Medal of Merit (Czech Republic)
Living people
21st-century violinists
21st-century Czech male musicians